Calyptommatus is a genus of Brazilian lizards in the family Gymnophthalmidae.

The genus shows extreme reduction of hind limbs and absence of fore limbs. Also prefrontals, frontals, supraoculars, and frontoparietals are absent.

Species
There are five species:
 Calyptommatus confusionibus Rodrigues, Zaher, and Curcio, 2001
 Calyptommatus frontalis Recoder, Marques-Souza, Silva-Soares, Ramiro, Castro, & Rodrigues, 2022
 Calyptommatus leiolepis Rodrigues, 1991
 Calyptommatus nicterus Rodrigues, 1991
 Calyptommatus sinebrachiatus Rodrigues, 1991

References

 
Lizards of South America
Reptiles of Brazil
Endemic fauna of Brazil
Lizard genera
Taxa named by Miguel Trefaut Rodrigues